Quadir Maynard (born 30 May 1993) is a Bermudian footballer who plays for North Village Rams.

Club career
Maunard began his career as a striker with Boulevard Blazers, before joining the Bermuda Hogges in the USL Second Division.

He moved to Bromley on a two-year development contract, earning a playing contract with the club in November 2011 until the end of the season. In November 2012, Maynard made his debut for Robin Hood and joined North Village Rams a year later.

International career
Maynard made his debut for Bermuda in a September 2011 FIFA World Cup qualification match against Guyana and has, as of November 2015, earned a total of three caps, scoring no goals. He has represented his country in three FIFA World Cup qualification matches.

References

External links

1993 births
Living people
Bermudian footballers
Association football midfielders
Bermuda international footballers
USL League Two players
Bermuda Hogges F.C. players
Bromley F.C. players
North Village Rams players
Bermudian expatriate footballers
Bermudian expatriate sportspeople in England
Expatriate footballers in England